The Central State Film Archive is the main film archive of Albania. Based in Tirana, the archive has listed in its repository 271 feature films, 166 animated films, 1,131 documentaries and 1,012 film chronicles between the years 1945–2015.

See also 
 Lists of film archives
 Cinema of Albania
 National Center of Cinematography (Albania)
 List of Albanian films
 List of archives in Albania

References

Film archives in Europe
Archives in Albania